Coquelet can mean:

Coquelet, a type of multiple frequency-shift keying signal
Coquelet, another name for a poussin (chicken)
coquelet is otherly (autrement) said little Coq*